Bezbozhnik may refer to:
Bezbozhnik (magazine), a Soviet satirical magazine
Bezbozhnik (newspaper), a Soviet anti-religious and atheistic newspaper 
Bezbozhnik (rural locality), name of several rural localities in Russia

See also 
Bezbozhnik u Stanka, a Soviet satirical magazine